Sailing at the Friendship Games was contested in seven events. 470 and Finn classes took place at Lake Balaton, Hungary between 20 and 25 August 1984, while Flying Dutchman, Soling, Star, Tornado and Windglider classes were contested at Pirita Yachting Centre in Tallinn, Soviet Union between 19 and 26 August 1984.

Medal summary

Although multiple competitors from one country were allowed to compete, only one team per country could receive a medal. If two or three teams from one country would finish in the top three, only the best one would receive a medal.

Medal table

See also
 Sailing at the 1984 Summer Olympics

Notes

References

 

Friendship Games
1984 in sailing
1984 in Hungarian sport
1984 in Soviet sport
Friendship Games
Sailing competitions in the Soviet Union
Sailing competitions in Hungary